Sol Líneas Aéreas Flight 5428 was a passenger flight which crashed near Los Menucos, Argentina, on 18 May 2011, killing all 22 people on board. The aircraft involved, a Saab 340, was operating Sol Líneas Aéreas' scheduled domestic service from Neuquén to Comodoro Rivadavia.

The following investigation concluded that severe airframe icing had led to a loss of control from which the crew was unable to recover. The crash is the deadliest aviation accident involving a Saab 340.

History of the flight
Flight 5428 had taken off from Rosario International Airport at 17:35 local time (20:35 UTC) on 18 May bound for Comodoro Rivadavia Airport. The service was scheduled to stop over at Córdoba, Mendoza and Neuquén. After completing uneventfully the first three segments, the Saab 340 took off from Presidente Perón International Airport in Neuquén at 20:05 for its final leg.

With icing conditions persisting, the crew initiated a descent to FL140, but during the following 7 minutes, icing conditions significantly worsened. Control of the aircraft was lost shortly after, and the Saab 340 impacted the ground in a remote region of the Río Negro Province, between the villages of Los Menucos and Prahuaniyeu.

The aircraft was flying at night, in instrument meteorological conditions and in an area without VHF radio coverage. A mayday call was received by the crew of a business jet flying in the area shortly before Flight 5428 was lost. A few moments later they heard explosions and noticed black smoke coming from the ground. Firefighters arrived at the scene three hours later, finding no survivors.

Aircraft and crew
The plane involved in the accident was a 26-year-old Saab 340A twin-turboprop. It was delivered to Comair in 1985 and registered N344CA. In 1997, it became N112PX with Northwest Express. It retained the same registration when it went to the Puerto Rican carrier Fina Air in 2003, and later on, when it went to fly for RegionsAir in 2006. The airplane was stored by this latter airline in 2007 before being bought by Sol Líneas Aéreas in July 2010.

The flight crew consisted of Captain Juan Raffo (45), who had 6,902 flight hours (2,181 in the Saab 340), First Officer Adriano Bolatti (37), who had 1,340 flight hours (285 in the Saab 340), and one flight attendant.

Passengers
One of the passengers was a child, while the rest were adults. Nine passengers boarded the airplane in Mendoza, nine in Neuquén, and one in Córdoba. One of the passengers used a passport for identification purposes at the check-in desk, while the rest used Argentine Documento Nacional de Identidad (DNI) identity documents. All of the passengers had Comodoro Rivadavia as their final destination, except for one of them, who flew from Córdoba to Mendoza.

Investigation
The aircraft's flight recorders were recovered two days after the crash. The Argentinian Junta de Investigaciones de Accidentes de Aviación Civil (JIAAC) opened an investigation into the accident. In September 2011, a preliminary report was issued which stated that the cause of the accident was a stall due to severe airframe icing and subsequent loss of control.

The JIAAC published its final report in March 2015, confirming the findings of the preliminary report. No evidence of technical defects in the aircraft was found. It was determined that the icing conditions encountered were so severe that the aircraft's de-icing systems were overwhelmed. However, it was also noted that engine power and airspeed management by the flight crew was inadequate; in particular, the engines were never set to full power and the airspeed was allowed to decay until the aircraft stalled. It was also determined that the weather reports that the crew received called for minor icing, and thus they were not prepared for the conditions that they actually encountered.

The JIAAC described the crew's stall recovery technique as inappropriate and issued several safety recommendations to aviation authorities and organisations, calling for more pilot training in aircraft upset recovery, incipient stall recognition and stall recovery.

In popular culture 
The accident is featured in the sixth episode of Season 20 of Mayday, also known as Air Crash Investigation. The episode is titled "Icy Descent".

See also
List of accidents and incidents involving commercial aircraft

References

External links
 
 Informe Básico de Accidente de Aviación (Archive) – Junta de Investigaciones de Accidentes de Aviación Civil 
 Administración Nacional de Aviación Civil 
 "LA ADMINISTRACIÓN NACIONAL DE AVIACIÓN CIVIL INFORMA" (Archive) – 18 May 2011
 "LA JUNTA DE INVESTIGACIONES DE ACCIDENTES DE AVIACIÓN CIVIL YA ESTÁ TRABAJANDO EN EL ACCIDENTE DEL VUELO 5428 DE SOL"(Archive) – 19 May 2011
 Sol Líneas Aéreas Informa – "Vuelo 5428 Comunicados de Prensa" 
Press Release #1 (Archive)
Press Release #2 (Archive)
Press Release #3 (Archive) – Includes passenger list
Press Release #4 (Archive)
 Press Release #5 (Archive)
"Tragedia aérea en Río Negro: iniciaron las tareas de rescate de los 22 fallecidos." Clarín. 19 May 2011. 
"La imagen de la tragedia en Río Negro." Todo Noticias. Thursday 19 May 2011. 
"Airliners.net." Photos of the crashed aircraft
Cockpit voice recorder transcript (Archive)

Aviation accidents and incidents in 2011
Aviation accidents and incidents in Argentina
Accidents and incidents involving the Saab 340
2011 in Argentina
May 2011 events in South America
Airliner accidents and incidents caused by ice